Steven or Steve Buckingham may refer to:

Steve Buckingham (rugby league), New Zealand rugby league footballer who played in the 1990s, and coach
Steve Buckingham (record producer), record producer